Enniaunus (Welsh: Einion mab Arthal) was a legendary king of the Britons as recounted by Geoffrey of Monmouth. He was the son of King Archgallo and brother of Marganus II. According to Geoffrey, he ruled poorly and harshly causing him to be deposed due to tyranny. He was replaced with his cousin, Idvallo.

References

Legendary British kings
3rd-century BC rulers